My Way is a studio album by French singer M. Pokora, released in 2016. It is a tribute album to French singer Claude François, also known as Cloclo, reinterpreting twelve of his songs. It was released on 21 October 2016 and went straight to number 1 on SNEP, the official French Albums chart in its initial week of release. "Cette année-là", being a famous French remake of "December, 1963 (Oh, What a Night)" from The Four Seasons, was the debut single from the album.

Track listing

Charts

Weekly charts

Year-end charts

References

2016 albums
M. Pokora albums
Sony Music France albums